William Weldon "Ted" Bennett, Jr. (born December 24, 1940, in Halifax, Virginia) is an American politician. A Democrat, he served in the Virginia House of Delegates 1990–2002. On March 13, 2009, he announced that he was running for reelection to his old seat in the 60th district after his Republican successor, Clarke Hogan, announced his own retirement.

Early life
Bennett was born in Halifax County, Virginia. He attended the University of Virginia, receiving a B.A. degree in 1963 and a J.D. in 1966. He then went into law practice in Halifax County.

Political career
Bennett served one term (1976–80) as Commonwealth's Attorney for Halifax County and the independent city of South Boston.

He was first elected to the House of Delegates in 1989. Bennett was co-chair of the Science and Technology committee 2000–01.

Notes

References

External links

1940 births
Living people
Democratic Party members of the Virginia House of Delegates
County and city Commonwealth's Attorneys in Virginia
Virginia lawyers
University of Virginia School of Law alumni
People from Halifax, Virginia